Jacob Bernard-Docker (born June 30, 2000) is a Canadian professional ice hockey defenceman currently playing with the Belleville Senators in the American Hockey League (AHL) as a prospect to the Ottawa Senators of the National Hockey League (NHL). Bernard-Docker was drafted in the first round, 26th overall, by the Senators in the 2018 NHL Entry Draft.

Early life
Bernard-Docker was born on June 30, 2000, in Canmore, Alberta, Canada to parents Thomas and Rolanda Bernard-Docker. Although he was born and raised in Canmore, his family spent every summer in Pictou County to visit his grandparents. Bernard-Docker played peewee ice hockey with a AA team in Cochrane and a bantam AAA in Airdrie, Alberta before enrolling at the Edge School for Athletes with his two younger siblings. During this time, he was selected to participate in the 2010 Brick Invitational Super Novice Tournament.

Playing career

Amateur
While serving as captain of the Airdrie Extreme bantam AAA team, Bernard-Docker was drafted in the fifth round, 98th overall, by the Swift Current Broncos of the Western Hockey League. At the time of his selection, he had accumulated 20 points through 32 games. However, he chose to follow the Alberta Junior Hockey League (AJHL) route in order to maintain his collegiate eligibility. Upon joining the Okotoks Oilers of the AJHL for the 2016–17 season, Bernard-Docker tallied seven goals and 15 assists through 54 games. During his rookie season with the Oilers, he participated in various health programs including Bell Let's Talk and the Royal Canadian Mounted Police's Drug Abuse Resistance Education program. In February 2017, Bernard-Docker committed to play for the University of North Dakota Fighting Hawks men's ice hockey team.

Bernard-Docker returned to the Oilers for the 2017–18 season where he greatly improved offensively and received numerous awards including the CJHL's Top Defenceman and W.G. (Bill) Scott Memorial Trophy. Bernard-Docker scored 20 goals and added 21 assists for 41 points through 49 games in order to tie sixth in offensive production among all AJHL defencemen. Leading up to the 2018 NHL Entry Draft, Bernard-Docker was placed 33rd overall for North American skaters in the final NHL Central Scouting Bureau rankings. He was eventually drafted in the first round, 26th overall, by the Ottawa Senators, making him the highest drafted Okotoks Oilers player in team history. Despite being drafted, Bernard-Docker stayed committed to the University of North Dakota.

Collegiate
Bernard-Docker played with the North Dakota Fighting Hawks from 2018 to 2021 while majoring in kinesiology. When speaking of his decision to go through the NCAA, Bernard-Docker said, "[t]he reputation of North Dakota moving guys on is a big factor in my decision, but the coaching staff was probably the biggest and their professionalism and knowledge of the game." Through his first 13 collegiate games, Bernard-Docker tallied nine points, including a 3-game point streak, to tie for the team scoring leader. As such, he received the NCHC Defenseman of the Week for the ending on November 26. As the season continued, Bernard-Docker was again named the NCHC Defenseman of the Week for the week ending on January 14 after he helped the Fighting Hawks sweep Colorado College. He was invited to participate in Team Canada's selection camp ahead of the 2019 World Junior Ice Hockey Championships but was cut before the final roster was finalized. Bernard-Docker finished his season with five goals and added 12 assists for 17 points. He was also named an AHCA Krampade Division I All American Scholar for having earned at least a 3.6 grade-point average during each semester of the 2018–19 academic year.

Following his freshman season, Bernard-Docker improved offensively and tallied three goals and 11 assists through his first 17 games of the 2019–20 season. On October 12, he became the first Fighting Hawks player to record four points in a single game since Tucker Poolman in 2017. As a result of his improved play, Bernard-Docker was selected to participate with Team Canada at the 2020 World Junior Ice Hockey Championships. Upon returning from Team Canada, he recorded his first career multi-goal game in the season finale at Omaha and finished the season with seven goals and 18 assists for 25 points through 32 games. Bernard-Docker was also named an NCHC Distinguished Scholar-Athlete and a member of the NCHC All-Academic Team.

Once collegiate hockey resumed in November 2020, Bernard-Docker was named an assistant captain for the Fighting Hawks alongside Mark Senden and Jasper Weatherby. He was also chosen for the 2020 NCHC Preseason All-Conference Team. In their season opener, Bernard-Docker and teammate Weatherby knelt during the national anthem.

Professional
On April 1, 2021, Bernard-Docker signalled the end of his collegiate career by signing a three-year, entry-level contract with the Ottawa Senators. He then made his NHL debut on April 14, playing 15:33 and blocking two shots, during a loss to the Winnipeg Jets. Once the season concluded, Bernard-Docker was selected to replace New Jersey Devils’ defenceman Kevin Bahl for Team Canada during the 2021 IIHF World Championship. Upon returning to North America, Bernard-Docker skated with members of the Senators roster instead of participating in the teams' development part of preseason camp. 

Prior to the start of the 2021–22 season, Bernard-Docker was assigned to the Senators American Hockey League (AHL) affiliate, the Belleville Senators, for the start of the season. After playing in 11 games with their AHL affiliate, tallying two goals and one assist, Bernard-Docker received his first NHL call-up of the season due to Nikita Zaitsev being added to the NHL's Covid-19 protocol. In his first NHL game of the season, he played 8:47 and tallied his first career NHL point by notching the primary assist on Zach Sanford's goal.

Career statistics

Regular season and playoffs

International

Awards and honors

References

External links
 

2000 births
Living people
Belleville Senators players
Canadian ice hockey defencemen
Ice hockey people from Alberta
National Hockey League first-round draft picks
North Dakota Fighting Hawks men's ice hockey players
Okotoks Oilers players
Ottawa Senators draft picks
Ottawa Senators players
People from Canmore, Alberta